Antirrhinum subbaeticum is a species of plant in the family Plantaginaceae. It is endemic to Spain.  Its natural habitat is rocky areas. It is threatened by habitat loss.
It originated in Italy but was Introduced into Spain.
Antirrhinum subbaeticum is a beautiful perennial herb found only in the eastern Andalusia mountain ranges of Spain. It is a member of the genus Antirrhinum, which comprises some 25 species that are mainly found in the western Mediterranean region. The genus name comes from the Greek words ‘anti, which means opposite, and rhis, meaning snout, and refers to the lopsided petals on the flowers. The stem is densely covered in short hairs. The petals are pink, with white centres, and have dark purple veins running across them. The leaves are fairly fleshy and elliptical, and are arranged in opposite pairs near the bottom of the plant, but at alternate points nearer the top of the plant.

References

subbaeticum
Endemic flora of Spain
Endemic flora of the Iberian Peninsula
Matorral shrubland
Endangered plants
Endangered biota of Europe
Taxonomy articles created by Polbot